α-Eleostearic acid or (9Z,11E,13E)-octadeca-9,11,13-trienoic acid, is an organic compound, a conjugated fatty acid and one of the isomers of octadecatrienoic acid. It is often called simply eleostearic acid although there is also a β-eleostearic acid (the all-trans or (9E,11E,13E) isomer). Its high degree of unsaturation gives tung oil its properties as a drying oil.

Biochemical properties

In their pioneering work on essential fatty acids, Burr, Burr and Miller compared the nutritional properties of α-eleostearic acid (ELA) to that of its isomer alpha-linolenic acid (ALA).  ALA relieved essential fatty acid deficiency; ELA did not.

In rats, α-eleostearic acid is converted to a conjugated linoleic acid. The compound has been found to induce programmed cell death of fat cells, and of HL60 leukemia cells in vitro at a concentration of 20 μM.  Diets containing 0.01% bitter gourd seed oil (0.006% as α-eleostearic acid) were found to prevent azoxymethane-induced colon carcinogenesis in rats.

Sources
α-Eleostearic acid is found in the oils extracted from seeds. Tung oil has 82% α-eleostearic acid.  Bitter gourd seed oil has 60% α-eleostearic acid.

Etymology
Eleo- is a prefix derived from the Greek word for olive, ἔλαιον.

See also
15,16-Dihydroxy-alpha-eleostearic acid

References

Fatty acids
Alkenoic acids
Polyenes